Lewis Daniel Scherer (June 11, 1879 – July 16, 1963) was an American football coach. He served as the head football coach at  Nebraska State Normal School—now known as Peru State College—from 1907 to 1908 and at  Baker University from 1910 to 1912, compiling a career college football record of 12–17–3.  He was an alumnus of the University of Chicago.

Scherer is listed as a member of the 1905 University of Chicago national championship team as a starting right guard.

Coaching career
Scherer was the head football at the Baker University in Baldwin City, Kansas. He held that position for three seasons, from 1910 until 1912.  His coaching record at Baker was  8–13–2. Prior to coming to Baker, Scherer served as physical director for Nebraska State Normal School in Peru, Nebraska.

Death
Scherer died in Centralia, Washington in 1963.

References

External links
 

1879 births
1963 deaths
American football guards
Baker Wildcats football coaches
Chicago Maroons football players
Peru State Bobcats football coaches
Peru State Bobcats men's basketball coaches
People from Gallatin County, Illinois